Karat is a fractional measure of purity for gold alloys.

Karat may also refer to:

Aviation
 Karat (airline), a former Russian airline
 SDB Karat, a Russian ultralight trike design

Entertainment
 Karat (band), a German band

People
 Brinda Karat (born 1947), Indian politician and Member of Parliament
 Prakash Karat (born 1948), Indian politician and General Secretary of Communist Party of India (Marxist)
 KARAT, a KGB code word for former FBI agent and convicted spy Robert Hanssen (born 1944)

Places
 Karat, Iran, a list of places in Iran
 Karat, Khuzestan, a village in Khuzestan Province, Iran
 Karat, Razavi Khorasan, a village in Razavi Khorasan Province, Iran
 Karat Rural District, an administrative subdivision of Razavi Khorasan Province, Iran

Other
 Karat banana, a cultivar grown in Micronesia
 Karat, an early Agfa cartridge for 35 mm film

See also
 Carat (disambiguation)
 Kareth or Karet, a biblical punishment
 Karot Hydropower Project